Major poetry related events taking place worldwide during 2022 are outlined below under different sections. These include poetry books released during the year in different languages, major poetry awards, poetry festivals and events, besides anniversaries and deaths of renowned poets etc. Nationality words link to articles with information on the nation's poetry or literature (for instance, India or France).

Events
 April 30 – Sierra Poetry festival was organised in Nevada City, California. The theme for this year was "On the Wings of Words".
 June 10 – A three-day international get together of poets and poetry translators titled Kolkata Poetry Confluence was organised at Kolkata, India by Antonym and Bhasha Sansad publishers.
 June 12 – Queensland Poetry Festival kicked off with this year's theme "Emerge" with live performances by Lorna Munro and Ethan Enoch-Barlow. The program also had special sessions on LGBTQ community.

Selection of works published in English

Australia
Les Murray, Waiting for the Past

Canada
Sarah de Leeuw, Lot

India
 Gopi Kottoor, Ramanan : The Pastoral

Lebanon
Zeina Hashem Beck, 0

New Zealand
Lang Leav, Lullabies

Nigeria
Akwaeke Emezi, Content Warning : Everything

Puerto Rico
Raquel Salas Rivera, Before Island is Volcano

United Kingdom
Warsan Shire, Bless the Daughter Raised by a Voice in Her Head

England
Amanda Gorman, The Hill We Climb
Eavan Boland, The Historians
Ella Risbridger, Set Me on Fire

Northern Ireland

Scotland

Criticism, scholarship and biography in the United Kingdom
 Katherine Rundell, Super-Infinite: The Transformations of John Donne

Ukraine

United States
Alphabetical listing by author name

Victoria Chang, Trees Witness Everything
Jos Charles, A Year and Other Poems
Amanda Gorman, The Hill We Climb
Ada Limon, The Hurting Kind
Roger Reeves, Best Barbarians
Solmaz Sharif, Customs

Viet Nam
Ocean Vuong, Time is a Mother

Anthologies in the United States
Kimiko Hahn & Harold Schechter (eds), Buzz Words: Poems About Insects

Criticism, scholarship and biography in the United States

Poets in The Best American Poetry 2019

Works published in other languages

French
 Abdellatif Laâbi, Le Castor astral
 Markus Hediger, Dans le cendrier du temps, Publisher: Éditions de l'Aire;

German

Awards and honors by country
See also: List of poetry awards
Awards announced this year:

International
 Struga Poetry Evenings Golden Wreath Laureate: Shuntaro Tanikawa
 Struga Poetry Evenings Bridges of Struga for the best debut: Gerardo Masuccio for "Fin Qui Visse Un Uomo"

Australia awards and honors
 Victorian Premier’s Prize for Poetry formerly known as C. J. Dennis Prize for Poetry :  
 Kenneth Slessor Prize for Poetry:

Canada awards and honors
 Archibald Lampman Award: '
 J. M. Abraham Poetry Award: 
 Governor General's Awards: 
 Griffin Poetry Prize: Douglas Kearney for "Sho"
 Latner Writers' Trust Poetry Prize: 
 Gerald Lampert Award: 
 Pat Lowther Award: 
 Prix Alain-Grandbois: 
 Raymond Souster Award: 
 Dorothy Livesay Poetry Prize: 
 Prix Émile-Nelligan:

France awards and honors
Prix Goncourt de la Poésie:

India awards and honors
Sahitya Akademi Award :- Youth Award (English) for "Tales of Hazaribagh" by Mihir Vatsa 
Jnanpith Award :- Damodar Mauzo for Konkani novels
Moortidevi Award :-
Saraswati Samman :- Ram Darash Mishra
Jibanananda Das Award :- Pallavi Singh & Anamika for Hindi; Snehaprava Das & Saroj Bal for Odia; Tapan Kumar Pradhan & Munawwar Rana for Urdu

New Zealand awards and honors
 Prime Minister's Awards for Literary Achievement:
 Poetry: 
 Mary and Peter Biggs Award for Poetry :

United Kingdom awards and honors
 Cholmondeley Award:  Menna Elfyn
 Costa Book Award for poetry: 
 English Association's Fellows' Poetry Prizes:
 Eric Gregory Award (for a collection of poems by a poet under the age of 30):
 Forward Poetry Prize: 
 Short List:  
Best Collection: 
Best Poem:
 Jerwood Aldeburgh First Collection Prize for poetry:
 Manchester Poetry Prize:  
 National Poet of Wales: 
 National Poetry Competition: 
 Queen's Gold Medal for Poetry: 
 Seamus Heaney Poetry Prize: 
 T. S. Eliot Prize:

United States awards and honors
 Arab American Book Award (The George Ellenbogen Poetry Award):
Honorable Mentions: 
 Agnes Lynch Starrett Poetry Prize:
 Anisfield-Wolf Book Award: 
 Beatrice Hawley Award from Alice James Books:
 Bollingen Prize: 
 Jackson Poetry Prize: 
 Gay Poetry: 
 Lesbian Poetry: 
 Lenore Marshall Poetry Prize: 
 Los Angeles Times Book Prize: 
 National Book Award for Poetry (NBA):
 National Book Critics Circle Award for Poetry: 
 The New Criterion Poetry Prize: 
 Pulitzer Prize for Poetry:  Diane Seuss, Frank Sonnets
 Wallace Stevens Award: 
 Whiting Awards: 
 PEN Award for Poetry in Translation: 
 PEN Center USA 2021 Poetry Award: 
 PEN/Voelcker Award for Poetry:                     
 Raiziss/de Palchi Translation Award:
 Ruth Lilly Poetry Prize: 
 Kingsley Tufts Poetry Award: 
 Walt Whitman Prize –         – Judge: 
 Yale Younger Series:

From the Poetry Society of America
 Frost Medal: 
 Shelley Memorial Award: 
 Writer Magazine/Emily Dickinson Award:
 Lyric Poetry Award:
 Alice Fay Di Castagnola Award: 
 Louise Louis/Emily F. Bourne Student Poetry Award: 
 George Bogin Memorial Award: 
 Robert H. Winner Memorial Award: 
 Cecil Hemley Memorial Award:
 Norma Farber First Book Award: 
 Lucille Medwick Memorial Award: 
 William Carlos Williams Award:

Deaths
Birth years link to the corresponding "[year] in poetry" article:
 January 3 – Zheng Min (b. 1920), Chinese poet 
 January 12 – S. Ramesan (b. 1953), Indian Malayalam-language poet
 February 15 – Taina Tudegesheva (b. 1958), Russian poet and translator
 February 16 – Michel Deguy (b. 1931), French Malayalam-language poet
 March 1 – Jordie Albiston (b. 1961), Australian poet
 March 31 – Richard Howard (b. 1930), American poet and 1970 Pulitzer prize winner
 April 7 – Maya R. Govind (b. 1940), Hindi poet, lyricist and singer
 June 4 – George Lamming (b. 1927), Barbadian poet
 June 12 – Peter Scupham (b. 1933), British English-language poet
 June 14 – Simon Perchik (b. 1924), American poet
 June 15 – Kazue Morisaki (b. 1927), Japanese Japanese-language poet
 June 20 – Alphonse Allain (b. 1925), French French-language poet
 June 21 – Patrizia Cavalli (b. 1947), Italian poet 
 June 21 – Ancelin Roseti (b. 1967), Romanian-language poet
 August 18 – Hadrawi (Mohamed Ibrahim Warsame) (b. 1943), Somalian poet
 August 29 – Craig Powell (b. 1940), Australian poet and psychoanalyst
 December 16 – Robert Adamson (b. 1943), Australian poet

See also

 Poetry
 List of years in poetry
 List of poetry awards

References

External links

2020s in poetry
2020s poems
 
2022-related lists
Culture-related lists by year